The Awaswas were a group of the Indigenous peoples of California in North America. Academic research suggests that their ancestors had lived within the Santa Cruz Mountains region for approximately 12,000 years. The Awaswas maintained regular trade networks with regional cultures before the Spanish colonists began settling in the area from the 18th century.

The Awaswas people were Ohlone, with linguistic and cultural ties to other Ohlone peoples in the region. "Ohlone" is a modern collective term for the peoples of the region; however, the term was not historically used by the indigenous populations themselves.

Awaswas speakers were formerly distributed over much of the northern Monterey Bay area, living along the Pacific Coast and the coastal mountain range of the Santa Cruz Mountains with territories between Point Año Nuevo and the Pajaro River in present-day Santa Cruz and San Mateo Counties.

Etymology 

The term Awaswas is an exonym derived from the Mutsun language and may refer and translate to "north". Unfortunately, translations for villages in Awaswas territory are difficult to piece together, as very little of the Awaswas language is still in circulation or on record. Many of the names for Monterey Bay places come from Mutsun words.

The Awaswas spoke an Ohlone dialect that has some structural affiliation to San Francisco Bay Ohlone and some affiliation to Mutsun Ohlone. An analysis of Awaswas shows it to represent disparate dialects spoken by Natives who were apparently in the midst of language shift from a divergent form of San Francisco Bay to Mutsun. Awaswas Ohlone continues to be considered a separate language, but the degree to which it originally extended to the east of present-day Santa Cruz County is completely unknown.

Divisions 
The Awaswas were divided into six distinct sub-groups, and further branched into bands. There is evidence that this grouping was more geographic than linguistic, and that the records of the 'Santa Cruz Costanoan' language in fact represent several diverse dialects. The earliest known European record of the Awaswas identified them at Whitehouse Creek. The Franciscans named local tribes after saints.

Quiroste 
The largest and most economically and politically powerful tribe of the Santa Cruz Mountains, the Quiroste lived at the northern edge of the mountain range on the Pacific Coast from Bean Hollow south to Año Nuevo Creek, and inland to Butano Ridge. The Quiroste derived their political influence from controlling the production of Monterey chert arrowheads and Olivella snail shell beads, the latter being used as currency throughout Indigenous California.

Two known villages were Churmutcé (south of Oljons, present-day Pescadero) and Mitenne (west of Chipletac) at Whitehouse Creek. It was at Mitenne that the Portola Expedition first encountered the Awaswas on October 23, 1769. At the time of their first interactions with the Spanish, the chief of the Quiroste was Charquin. The Spanish renamed the people "San Rafael".

Cotoni 
Just south of the Quiroste and north of the Uypi, the Cotoni lived along the Pacific Ocean, near present-day Davenport, likely including the inland ridge of Ben Lomond Mountain in the Bonny Doon area. They subsisted on shellfish from the coast and carried them to the hills, where their villages were located. Two known villages were Asar and Jlli.
 Achistaca (Mutsun: "Place of the Enemy/Competitor")
An inland Cotoni group that lived in the Santa Cruz Mountains away from the coast. It is believed that they lived in the upper San Lorenzo River drainage near the present-day towns of Boulder Creek and Riverside Grove. They held kinship ties with the Cotoni, Sayanta, and Chaloctaca. The Spanish renamed the people "San Dionisio".

Uypi 
The Uypi were concentrated along the mouth of the San Lorenzo River in present-day Santa Cruz and Soquel Creek. Uypi territory was rich in fields and coastal terraces. Three known villages were Aulintak ("Place of Red Abalone", near the river mouth), Chalumü (about one mile northwest of Aulintak), and Hottrochtac (one mile further northwest). They held kinship ties with the Aptos, Sayanta, Cajastaca, Chaloctaca, Cotoni, Pitac, and Chitactac. At the time of their first interactions with the Spanish, the chief of the Uypi was Soquel ("Laurel Tree").

The Spanish identified Aulintak as an ideal settlement site for Mission Santa Cruz and renamed the people "San Daniel". By 1810, the Spanish began to call the Uypi tribe the Soquel tribe.

Aptos 
At the southern edge of Uypi territory, bound by Aptos Creek and Monterey Bay at the western edge of their land, and eastward about halfway to the Pajaro River, lived the Aptos ("The People"). The Aptos tribe was one of the larger Awaswas groups in the region. They held kinship ties with the Uypi, Calendaruc (a Mutsun speaking people), and Cajastaca. At the time of their first interactions with the Spanish, the chief of the Aptos was Molegnis. The Spanish renamed the people "San Lucas".
 Cajastaca 
Living to the south of the Aptos, the Cajastaca ("Jackrabbit") were a sub-group of the larger Aptos tribe. The Spanish renamed the people "San Antonio".

Sayanta 
The Sayanta tribe was a smaller Awaswas group that lived in the Santa Cruz Mountains around the Zayante Creek drainage, near present-day Scotts Valley, Glenwood, and Laurel to the north and east. They held kinship ties with the Chaloctaca and Achistaca. The Spanish renamed the people "San Juan Capistrano".

Chaloctaca 
The Chaloctaca lived along the crest of the Santa Cruz Mountains around Loma Prieta Creek. They may have been a separate village community of one larger group with the Sayanta. They held kinship ties with the Sayanta, Achistaca, Cotoni, Partacsi of Santa Clara Valley, and Somontoc. The Spanish renamed the people "Jesus" (Mission Santa Cruz) and "San Carlos" (Mission Santa Clara de Asís).

History 

Indigenous Awaswas were Ohlone peoples, with linguistic and genetic ties to other Ohlone groups, such as peoples of the Mutsun, Ramaytush, Rumsien, and Tamien. Santa Cruz had been the home to the Awaswas people whose self-sustaining culture supported them in the coastal bioregion of the Monterey Bay for more than 12,000 years.

European period (1769-1821)

Under Spanish rule 

The Spanish called the Awaswas "the Santa Cruz people" and theirs became the main language spoken at the Mission Santa Cruz. During the era of Spanish missions in California, the Awaswas people's lives changed with the Mission Santa Cruz (founded in 1791) built in their territory. Most were forced into slavery at this mission and were baptized, lived and educated to be Catholic neophytes, also known as Mission Indians, until the missions were discontinued by the Mexican Government in 1834.

Awaswas tribes and villages
The Awaswas territory was bordered by the Pacific Ocean to the west, and other Ohlone people on all other sides: the Ramaytush to the north, Tamien to the east, and the Mutsun and Rumsien to the south.
The Awaswas population living between Davenport and Aptos was estimated at 600 people in 1770.

The villages included the Sokel, who lived at Aptos, and the Chatu-mu, who lived near the current location of Santa Cruz.

Awasawas neophytes at the Mission Santa Cruz came from the following villages, located in today's Santa Cruz County:
Achilla, Aestaca, Agtisrn, Apil, Aulintac, Chalumü, Chanech, Chicutae, Choromi, Coot, Hauzaurni, Hottrochtac, Huachi, Hualquilme, Huocom, Locobo, Luchasmi, Mallin, Nohioalli, Ochoyos, Onbi, Osacalis (Souquel), Payanmin, Sachuen, Sagin, Shiuguermi, Shoremee, Sio Cotchmin, Tejey, Tomoy, Turami, Utalliam, Wallanmi, Yeunaba, Yeunata, Yeunator.

Awaswas peoples today 
There are no living survivors  of the Awaswas, who are spoken for by the Amah Mutsun Tribal Band.

In 2011, a march was held in Santa Cruz to preserve "the Knoll", the 6,000-year-old burial site of a child, located near Branciforte Creek.

Awaswas people, the "documented descendants of Missions San Juan Bautista and Santa Cruz", have become members of the  tribal band. In 2012, Amah Mutsun Tribal Chairman Valentin Lopez stated that "tribe members are scattered. Few can afford to live in their historic lands today," and many now make their homes in the Central Valley.

See also
California genocide
Ohlone tribes and villages in Santa Cruz Mountains
Mission Indians
Reductions
Slavery among Native Americans in the United States
Population of Native California

Notes

References 

 Kroeber, Alfred L. 1925. Handbook of the Indians of California. Washington, D.C: Bureau of American Ethnology Bulletin No. 78. (map of villages, page 465)
 Milliken, Randall. A Time of Little Choice: The Disintegration of Tribal Culture in the San Francisco Bay Area 1769-1910 Menlo Park, CA: Ballena Press Publication 1995.  (alk. paper)
 Teixeira, Lauren. The Costanoan/Ohlone Indians of the San Francisco and Monterey Bay Area, A Research Guide. Menlo Park, CA: Ballena Press Publication, 1997. .
 Yamane, Linda, ed. 2002. A Gathering of Voices: The Native Peoples of the Central California Coast. Santa Cruz County History Journal, Number 5. Santa Cruz, CA: Museum of Art & History. 

California Mission Indians
Extinct Native American tribes
Native American tribes in California
Ohlone
Aptos, California
History of Santa Cruz County, California
Santa Cruz Mountains